Solomon Young Hughes (born February 28, 1979) is an American educator, athlete, and actor known for his leading role in Winning Time: The Rise of the Lakers Dynasty a sports drama television series on HBO.

Sports career
His father, Ronald Hughes, played basketball at California State University, Fullerton and is a professor of sociology there. He played on the basketball team at Bishop Montgomery High School in Torrance, California, graduating in 1997. At age 17 he signed a letter of intent to play for Tulane University, but decided not to enroll there, which subjected him to a two-year ban on playing NCAA basketball. He attended Fort Union Military Academy for the 1997-98 school year, then enrolled in the University of California, Berkeley, practicing with the California Golden Bears despite his ineligibility. Upon appeal, the NCAA reinstated his eligibility on November 3, 1998, and Hughes played his first collegiate game that night. Hughes played with the Golden Bears for four years and was a captain of the team. 

He played for the Harlem Globetrotters for 13 games and tried out for the National Basketball Association in 2003. Hughes also played professionally in the United States Basketball League, the American Basketball Association, and in a professional basketball league in Mexico.

Educational career
Hughes graduated from the University of California, Berkeley earning a BA in Sociology and MA in Education. In 2013 he received his PhD in Higher Education and Policy Studies from the University of Georgia Institute of Higher Education  for his dissertation titled “Approaching signing day: the college choice process of heavily recruited student athletes”. Hughes is an instructor and faculty affiliate at Duke University's Samuel DuBois Cook Center on Social Equity. He was also a visiting instructor on the academic staff at Stanford University as well as the assistant director of the EDGE Doctoral Fellowship Program at Stanford. In 2018 he was on the selection committee that chose Jim Knowlton to be Berkeley's director of athletics.

Acting career
Hughes was cast as Kareem Abdul-Jabbar in HBO's Winning Time: The Rise of the Lakers Dynasty. Playing Abdul-Jabbar was Hughes' first acting role, and the series has been renewed for a second season.

Notes

References

External links
 Golden Bears bio
 

1979 births
Living people
20th-century American male actors
African-American basketball players
African-American male actors
American male television actors
African-American educators
University of Georgia alumni
UC Berkeley Graduate School of Education alumni
UC Berkeley College of Letters and Science alumni
California Golden Bears men's basketball players
Harlem Globetrotters players